Ginger Mayson was a college volleyball coach. She started her coaching career at the University of South Alabama. Mayson became an assistant coach for Kansas State for the 1985 season, then started an eight-year career as the head coach of the Michigan State Spartans volleyball team.

Early life
Ginger Mayson graduated from the University of South Alabama in 1977 with a Bachelor's of Arts degree in criminal justice/administration. Mayson was a four time letter winner in volleyball and a three time letter winner in basketball. She also received all-conference honors twice. Mayson received a master's degree in public administration of South Alabama.

Coaching career

South Alabama
Mayson coached South Alabama for two years, accruing a record of 56–26. In 1982, she coached the team to a 42–13 record, at the time a program record. She coached at South Alabama from 1981–83.

Kansas State
Mayson was an assistant coach for the volleyball team for the 1984 season.

Michigan State
Ginger Mayson began coaching the Michigan State volleyball team in 1985. Mayson coached for eight years and finished her career with a record of 67–181. She finished with a Big Ten Conference record of 22–126.

Mayson coached for an underfunded program that performed poorly. Later in her coaching career, after coaching matches she would go home and cry about the hopelessness of the situation. She retired from the program in 1992, and ended her coaching career, but still kept a strong interest in volleyball. About coaching in the future, she said "I have no interest in coaching again. None. I haven't regretted giving it up for one second. Not one second."

Head coaching record

References

Michigan State Spartans women's volleyball coaches
South Alabama Jaguars women's volleyball players
South Alabama Jaguars women's volleyball coaches
Kansas State Wildcats women's volleyball coaches
Living people
Year of birth missing (living people)